Arindam Ghosh is an Indian experimental condensed matter physicist and a Professor in the Department of Physics, Indian Institute of Science, Bangalore, India. He was awarded the Shanti Swarup Bhatnagar Prize for science and technology, the highest science award in India, for the year 2012 in physical sciences category. In 2020, he was awarded the Infosys Prize for Physical Science, the most prestigious award that recognizes achievements in science and research, in India.

Education and Career
Ghosh majored in physics from Calcutta University (1991). Following the graduation, he moved to IISc, Bangalore where he did his masters (1994) and PhD (1999) in Physics. He was then a postdoctoral research associate at the University of Cambridge, UK (2000–2005). Ghosh then came back to IISc to take up a position as an assistant professor (2005–2011) followed by an associate professor (2011–2017). In 2017, he was promoted to a full professor of physics at the Department of Physics, IISc Bangalore. During his tenure at IISc, he was also a Visiting Research Fellow in Nanotechnology at T J Watson
Research Center of IBM, Yorktown Heights, New York, USA (May 2009 – Sept 2009).

Awards 
In December 2020, he received the Infosys Prize for Physical Sciences for his development of atomically thin two-dimensional semiconductors to build a new generation of functional electronic, thermoelectric and optoelectronic devices.

Research
His current research interests include the transport properties of two-dimensional electronic systems in semiconductors, carbon-based low-dimensional systems, optoelectronic properties of atomically-thin semiconductor membranes, magnetic nanostructures, and structural stability of nanoscale systems such as metallic nanowires and nanoparticles.

References

Recipients of the Shanti Swarup Bhatnagar Award in Physical Science
Year of birth missing (living people)
Living people
Academic staff of the Indian Institute of Science
Indian Institute of Science alumni
Indian condensed matter physicists
Scientists from West Bengal